Resource was launched in Calcutta in 1804 as a country ship; that is, she traded out of India but only east of the Cape of Good Hope. In 1807 the French captured her, but she returned to British ownership. She participated as a transport in the British invasion of Java. After 1813 she traded between Britain and India under a license from the British East India Company (EIC). From about the mid-1830s she traded primarily between Britain and Australia, and in 1839 she transported immigrants to South Australia. In 1843 she started sailing between Britain and Quebec until December 1846 when her crew had to abandon her at sea while on a voyage back to Britain from Quebec.

Career
Resource first appeared in readily available online sources in 1807 when the French frigate  captured Resource (of 480 tons), on 9 October 1807. Resource was carrying toile and 7,500 sacks of rice. The value of the prize was 215,930.24 francs. Resource returned to British ownership; she was registered at Calcutta prior to January 1811.

Resource was one of the transport vessels supporting the British Invasion of Java (1811).

In 1813 the EIC had lost its monopoly on the trade between India and Britain. British ships were then free to sail to India or the Indian Ocean under a license from the EIC.

Resource, James Henderson, master, arrived at Batavia on 31 October 1814 from Bengal and Bencooolen. She sailed from Java on 12 December 1814 for London and the Cape of Good Hope. 

Resource first appeared in Lloyd's Register (LR) in 1815.

In 1822 Resource was sold for a "Free Trader".

In 1813 the EIC lost its monopoly on the trade between India and Britain. British ships were then free to sail to India or the Indian Ocean under a license from the EIC.

Resource, W.Boyle, master, left London on 7 October 1838 and arrived at Adelaide on 23 January 1839 with 211 passengers. She sailed on to Port Phillip, returning to Adelaide on 13 May having lost 2280 out of the 2700 sheep she was carrying.

Fate
Resource was lost in 1846. On 26 December 1846, her crew abandoned their barque in the Atlantic Ocean; Georgiana  rescued the crew. Resource was on a voyage from Quebec City to London. The volume of LR for 1846 carried the annotation "LOST" by her name.

Citations and references
Citations

References
 
 
 
 
 

1804 ships
British ships built in India
Age of Sail merchant ships of England
Captured ships
Migrant ships to Australia
Maritime incidents in December 1846